Rose Wylie (born 14 October 1934) is a British painter. She is an artist known for creating large paintings on unprimed canvas.

Life and work
She was born in Hythe in Kent on 14 October 1934. Wylie studied at the Dover School of Art from 1952 to 1956 and later graduated from the Royal College of Art with an MA, in 1981.

She lives and works in her Kent cottage, producing extremely large paintings on unstretched, unprimed canvas, in her signature loose, spontaneous style. She paints from memory, usually taking her imagery from mass media. 

Wylie was one of the seven finalists for the 2009 Threadneedle Prize, and one of the winners of the 2011 Paul Hamlyn Foundation Prize for Visual Arts.

In 2010 Wylie was the only non-American artist represented in the Women to Watch exhibition at the National Museum of Women in the Arts, Washington DC. In 2012, she had a retrospective at Jerwood Gallery, Hastings, followed in 2013 by an exhibition at Tate Britain, London that featured recent works.

In September 2014, she won the John Moores Painting Prize. In February 2015 she became a member of the Royal Academy of Arts (RA Elect). In June of the same year she won the Charles Wollaston Award for "most distinguished work" in the Royal Academy Summer Exhibition.

She has been invited to meet and talk with students in the significant artists series ‘Artists Promenades’ at the Royal College of Art and given talks on her work at The Slade, Goldsmiths, Wimbledon College of Art, The Royal Academy Schools, The Royal Drawing School, John Moores Liverpool, the ICA and Tate Britain. Wylie has work in private and public collections including Tate Britain, the Arts Council Collection, Jerwood Foundation, Hammer Collection, and York City Art Gallery. In 2016 Rose Wylie: Pink Girls, Yellow curls  was held at the Städtische Galerie, Wolfsburg, and she has also had a solo show at the Douglas Hyde Gallery in Dublin.

Personal life
Her husband was Roy Oxlade, also a painter. Wylie initially gave up painting to raise their family.

Lack of money was not a limitation to her; she and her family had strategies to overcome this, offering informal painting classes at their house and turning the garden into a place for students to camp. In a short film, Wylie says that friends of her children asked why she was always dressed in the same clothes; her reply was “as a radical non consumer, I prefer dealing with what I have.”

In 1955 when Wylie was just 21 years old, studying art in Folkestone and Dover she was painted by Anthony Devas for the Aero girl ad campaign. She describes herself as being a “rebellious art student” at the time, adding that her look was “more Brigitte Bardot than Mills & Boon cover.” It is apt that the painting is labelled, not with the true identity of the sitter, but with the fictitious advertiser’s title, Alice.

As a young woman, Wylie regularly modelled for the artist John Ward and it was whilst his friend Devas was staying with him, that she sat for this Aero commission. She knew that the portrait would appear in Rowntree's Aero adverts and by the time she was at Goldsmiths College in 1956, it had already been published in the Daily Express, News of the World and People Illustrated.

References

External links
 
Tate Shots (biographical film) - Rose Wylie (2013)

1934 births
Living people
20th-century English painters
20th-century English women artists
21st-century English painters
21st-century English women artists
Alumni of the Royal College of Art
English contemporary artists
English women painters
Modern painters
People from Hythe, Kent
Royal Academicians